Portrait of a Man with Carnation is a small oil on oakwood painting usually attributed to the Early Netherlandish master Jan van Eyck or a member of his workshop. Based on dendrochronological examination of the wood, it is thought to have been completed relatively late in van Eycks career, perhaps around 1436. It is now in the Gemäldegalerie, Berlin. The sitter wears a large grey fur lined hat, and grey clothes, fur lined at the neck. holds a small bunch of carnations, symbols of marriage. He has not been identified, but wears the medal of the Order of Saint Anthony, established by Albert I, Duke of Bavaria. The man is older, probably in his early 50s, and has a coarse, rough look, which the artist does not shy from depicting.

Notes

Sources
 Ammann, Ruth. In The Enchantment of Gardens: A Psychological Approach. Daimon Verlag, 2009. 
 Giltay, J.  Review of "Hubert and Jan van Eyck" by Elisabeth Dhanens. Simiolus: Netherlands Quarterly for the History of Art, Volume 13, No. 1, 1983 
 Borchert, Till-Holger. Van Eyck. London: Taschen, 2008. 

1430s paintings
Portraits by Jan van Eyck